Curio Pictures (formerly known as Playmaker Media) is an Australian-based television production company, which develops and produces scripted and unscripted television programs across multiple television channels in Australia. The company was formed by David Taylor and David Maher in 2009. In 2014, it became a subsidiary of Sony Pictures Television, who distributes Playmaker's formats and productions globally. The company is based in Sydney.

In 2016, Playmaker was commissioned to produce a Mandarin language adaptation of Chosen for Chinese platform iQiyi filmed in Australia.

In 2022, Playmaker Media was renamed as Curio Pictures under Jo Porter and Rachel Gardner following the 2021 departure of founders David Taylor and David Maher.

Productions 
 Programs with a shaded background indicate the program is still in production.

References

External links 
 
 Playmaker Media at Sony Pictures Television

Television production companies of Australia
Australian companies established in 2009
Mass media companies established in 2009
Sony Pictures Entertainment
Sony Pictures Television production companies
Sony Pictures Television
Australian subsidiaries of foreign companies
2014 mergers and acquisitions
Companies based in Sydney